Royal Air Force Leicester East, more commonly known as RAF Leicester East , is a former Royal Air Force station, near the village of Stoughton,  east southeast of Leicester, Leicestershire, England.

It was constructed in 1942 and formally opened in October 1943. The airfield is now Leicester Airport.

History

The following units were posted to the airfield at some point:
 No. 190 Squadron RAF (1944), flying Short Stirling IV
 No. 196 Squadron RAF (1943–44), flying Short Stirling III & IV
 No. 620 Squadron RAF (1943–44), flying Short Stirling III
 No. 93 Group Screened Pilots School
 No. 107 (Transport) Operational Training Unit RAF
 No. 216 Maintenance Unit RAF (MU)
 No. 255 MU
 No. 1333 (Transport Support) Conversion Unit RAF

On 10 August 1944, at the formation of the First Allied Airborne Army, General Eisenhower visited RAF Leicester East to review 12,000 troops of the 82nd Airborne Division who were camped nearby and at other locations around Leicestershire and Nottinghamshire. He was accompanied by Brigadier General James M. Gavin, who had recently taken Command of the Division, Major General Matthew Ridgeway, who had recently taken Command of the XVIIIth Airborne Corps and Lieutenant General Lewis H. Brereton who would take Command of the First Allied Airborne Army, having previously Commanded the US 9th Army Air Force. Also present were small contingents of the five Groups that made up the US 52nd Troop Carrier Wing, the Wing mostly responsible for delivering the 82nd Airborne Division to combat in WWII.

On 19 February 1945, a Dakota of No. 107 OTU returning to Leicester East with personnel who had attended training at RAF Zeals, Wiltshire, crashed soon after taking off with the loss of 21 RAF, RAAF and RCAF lives.

In March 1945 all operational military aircraft left Leicester East, and the airfield was placed on Care and Maintenance until its closure on 31 December 1947.

Current use
Today, the former RAF Leicester East is now known as Leicester Airport, and was previously known as Stoughton Aerodrome.

The airfield, control tower, and other smaller buildings are now used by the Leicestershire Aero Club.

See also
 List of former Royal Air Force stations

References

Citations

Bibliography

Military units and formations established in 1943
Leicester East
Military units and formations disestablished in 1947
Leicester E